Iamarra is a monotypic genus of Australian long-jawed orb-weavers containing the single species, Iamarra multitheca. It was first described by A. Álvarez-Padilla, R. J. Kallal and Gustavo Hormiga in 2020, and it has only been found in Australia.

See also
 List of Tetragnathidae species

References

Monotypic Tetragnathidae genera
Spiders of Australia